The flag of Mozambique is the national flag of the Republic of Mozambique that was adopted on 1 May 1983. It is a tricolor flag with white fimbriations and a red triangle. Teal stands for the riches of the land, the white fimbriations signify peace, black represents the African continent, yellow symbolises the country's minerals, and red represents the struggle for independence.  It includes the image of a Kalashnikov rifle with a bayonet attached to the barrel crossed by a hoe, superimposed on an open book. The rifle stands for defence and vigilance, the open book symbolises the importance of education, the hoe represents the country's agriculture, and the star symbolizes the spirit of the international solidarity of the Mozambican people. It is one of four national flags among UN member states that feature a firearm, along with those of Guatemala, Haiti and Bolivia, but is the only one of the four to feature a modern firearm instead of cannons or muskets.

History
The flag is based on the flag of the Mozambican Liberation Front (FRELIMO), the leading political party in Mozambique. The FRELIMO flag, used for a brief period after the country gained its independence from Portugal, looks like the current flag but lacking the emblem, with green, black, and yellow horizontal stripes separated by white fimbriations and a red triangle in the hoist.

On independence the colours were rearranged to form the national flag, in diagonals emanating from the upper hoist. Over this was a white cogwheel containing the hoe, rifle, book, and star that appear on the present flag. The flag was altered in 1983; the colours were arranged in horizontal stripes, and the star was made larger. Later in the same year the cogwheel was removed, leading to the current form of the flag.

2005 new flag proposal
In 2005, a competition was held to design a new flag for Mozambique. This came in the context of a drive to create a new crest and anthem for the country. RENAMO, Mozambique's parliamentary opposition, specifically wanted to see two symbols removed from the flag: the star, which they saw as representative of the country's communist past; and the Kalashnikov assault rifle, which they argued is incompatible with a country trying to be peaceful after the Mozambican Civil War. FRELIMO, the ruling party, argued that the star's resemblance to the communist symbol was coincidental, and that the rifle represented the nation's struggle for independence.

169 entries were received and a winning flag was selected, but was rejected by the FRELIMO-led parliament in December 2005. All 169 proposed flags were turned down, including the current flag without the rifle.

Gallery

Presidential standards

Historical flags

Regional flags

References

External links 

Mozambique
National symbols of Mozambique
Mozambique
Mozambique